Twenty-five is the Irish national card game, which also underlies the Canadian game of Forty-fives. Charles Cotton describes it in 1674 as "Five Fingers", a nickname applied to the Five of Trumps extracted from the fact that the Irish word cúig means both 'five' and 'trick'.  It is supposed to be of great antiquity, and widely believed to have originated in Ireland, although "its venerable ancestor", Maw, of which James I of England was very fond, is a Scottish game.

Name 
The game goes under a variety of names and spellings including Spoil Five, Spoil-Five, Spoilt Five and Five and Ten.

History

The earliest records of the Scottish game of Maw date from 1550 and then frequently up to about 1650.

Twenty-five, or Spoil Five was the name under which Maw resurfaced during the 19th century. It is considered as the national card game of Ireland and is related to the Spanish game of ombre. Twenty-five has also been known as Maw by the British King James I; it was only later called Spoil Five as a result of its objective to stop the five of trumps.  The Canadian game of Forty-fives derives from Twenty-five.

Object
Edmund Hoyle in his The Complete Gamester describes it as Five-cards. In the game of Five Cards, for example, when played by only two persons, Five and Ten, the card second in value is stated to be the ace of hearts, instead of the knave of trumps.

Spoil Five or Twenty-five, is a member of one of the most common families of card games based on this pattern: each player receives five cards, or six or nine, and another is turned up to fix the trump suit.  The object of the play is to win one trick, or at least three of five.

The game is played by 2–8 persons, five being the best number. When three play at this game, it is still necessary that one of them should win the three tricks in order to make a Five, as the stakes must remain for the next game if two of the players get two tricks each, and the other one. If the party consists of four, they play in two partnerships, which are determined by cutting the cards, the two lowest playing against the two highest, or by agreement among the parties. When six people play, it is usual to play in three partnerships, and when eight people play, in four.

Preliminaries
A full pack of 52 cards is used and each player receives five cards, dealt in pairs and triplets, being the next card on the top of the pack turned up for trumps. Each player starts with a prearranged amount, which may be of 20 chips or counters, and puts up one chip upon the table to form a pool. The pool is usually limited to a certain maximum, which once reached there is no further subscription, though each dealer is required to "tit-up" the pool.

The turn to deal and play always passes to the left, and after the first hand, each player deals in rotation. Where the game is strictly played, the person who misdeals, or who departs from the order with which the game began, of dealing either the three or the two cards first, forfeits his stake. Stack the rest face down, turning the topmost card for trumps.

Robbing
If the turn-up is an ace, the dealer may "rob the trump" by putting out, face downwards, any card from his hand and take in the ace, but the trump suit remains unaltered. Similarly, a player who holds the ace of trumps may himself rob the trump at any time before playing to the first trick, putting out any card and taking in the turn-up, but need not disclose the fact until it is his turn to play. If the holder of the trump ace does not wish to rob, and does not announce the fact that he holds it before playing to the first trick, then, whenever he does play it, it counts as the lowest trump. A player who fails to rob cannot go out that hand. The card put out may not be seen. Robbing must take place before the first player on the dealer's left leads. Some players make "robbing" optional.

Ranking of cards

{|
|Trump diamonds ||  ||  ||  ||  ||  ||  ||  ||  ||  ||  ||  ||  ||  ||  ||  || 
|-
|Trump hearts ||  ||  ||  ||  ||  ||  ||  ||  ||  ||  ||  ||  ||  ||  ||  || 
|-
|Off-suit diamonds ||  ||  ||  ||  ||  ||  ||  ||  ||  ||  ||  ||  ||  ||  ||  ||  || 
|-
|Off-suit hearts ||  ||  ||  ||  ||  ||  ||  ||  ||  ||  ||  ||  ||  ||  ||  || 
|-
|Trump clubs ||  ||  ||  ||  ||  ||  ||  ||  ||  ||  ||  ||  ||  ||  ||  ||  || 
|-
|Trump spades ||  ||  ||  ||  ||  ||  ||  ||  ||  ||  ||  ||  ||  ||  ||  ||  || 
|-
|Off-suit clubs ||  ||  ||  ||  ||  ||  ||  ||  ||  ||  ||  ||  ||  ||  ||  ||  || 
|-
|Off-suit spades ||  ||  ||  ||  ||  ||  ||  ||  ||  ||  ||  ||  ||  ||  ||  ||  || 
|}

The play
The player on the dealer's left leads first. Players must follow suit whenever possible, and the highest card of the suit led or, if a trump is played, the highest trump wins the trick. You must lead with a trump if there are 5 or more players. If a player takes three tricks he wins the game. If no one succeeds there is a spoil, and a fresh stake, smaller than the original one as a rule, is put into the pool for the next round.

Reneging
This is called reneging (colloquially, "rejigging"). The 5 may always renege: if it is led, no card can renege. The J may renege if the 5 is played, not led. Only the 5 can renege to the J led. The  can renege to any inferior card.

Jinking
At Spoil Five a player winning the first three tricks straight off may claim the pool without further play. If however, he leads to the fourth trick (described as "jinking"), he thereby is obliged to win all five. If he elects to jink and fails, he cannot score during that hand. A player who jinks, if jinking is agreed upon, receives an extra stake all around.

Pay-off
If no one wins the three tricks, or if a player jinked and failed to win all five, the game is said to have been "spoiled". Everyone then adds another chip to the pool, which is carried forward to the next deal. Otherwise, whoever took three tricks wins the pool, with an additional chip from each opponent if he took all five.

Strategy
If the elder hand has a certain five, that is to say, if he holds three cards which will each take a trick, he ought to play them, as there is a great probability, if his two remaining cards are tolerable, that he may get the whole five, and thus win a double stake. But if he holds only indifferent cards, the best method is to throw the lead into his opponent's hand by playing an inferior card, in the hope of regaining it at the third trick, which is the critical stage of the game; and as three tricks constitute a five equally as four, it is reckoned better play to reserve the best cards till the third trick, than to risk the game by eagerness to secure the first two.

Variants
Twenty-five and Forty-five are varieties of Spoil-five and they are played for either of these numbers. The main feature between these two varieties and the game of Spoil Five is that there is no Spoil. Each trick counts five to the maker and the trick made by the highest trump out scores ten. If a player gets out before that trump is played, he wins the game all the same. The winning of all five tricks is called a jink and the player who jinks wins the game whether played for twenty-five or forty-five points.

See also
Ombre, related Spanish card game
The Revells of Christendome

References

External links
 The Little Giant Encyclopedia of Card Games at Google Books
 Two Card Games from Tudor England and How to Play Them - History and rules of Maw.

16th-century card games
Spoil Five group
Irish card games
Scottish card games
National symbols of the Republic of Ireland